Elizabeth Tudor was Queen Elizabeth I of England.

Elizabeth Tudor may also refer to:
Elizabeth Tudor (1492–1495), the second daughter and  the fourth child of Henry VII of England and Elizabeth of York
Elizabeth Tudor (writer) (born 1978), Azerbaijani-Russian science fiction writer